Rampur Khalyan  is a village in Phagwara Tehsil in Kapurthala district of Punjab State, India. The village is administrated by a Sarpanch, who is an elected representative.

Transport 
Phagwara Junction and Mauli Halt are the closest railway stations to Rampur Khalyan; Jalandhar City railway station is  distant. The village is 118 km from Sri Guru Ram Dass Jee International Airport in Amritsar and the closest airport is Sahnewal Airport  in Ludhiana which is located 40 km away from the village. Phagwara, Jandiala, Jalandhar, Phillaur are the nearby cities.

References

External links
  Villages in Kapurthala
 Kapurthala Villages List

Villages in Kapurthala district